Provincial Road 250 (PR 250) is a provincial road in the Canadian province of Manitoba. It a north-south route that provides access to the towns of Souris and Rivers from the Trans-Canada Highway (PTH 1).

Route description 
PR 250 begins at the intersection of PTH 2 and 22 in Souris, and runs due north to the Trans-Canada Highway.  The two run concurrently west to Alexander, after which PR 250 continues north again, through the town of Rivers to the Yellowhead Highway at Newdale.  It continues north to PTH 45 at Sandy Lake, after which it becomes a gravel road until it reaches its northern terminus at PR 354 near the southern boundary of Riding Mountain National Park.  Aside from the Trans-Canada Highway, PR 250 also has short concurrences with PTH 25, PR 355, and PTH 16.

Between Souris and the Trans-Canada Highway, PR 250 is classified as an RTAC route, which permits full truck and trailer access.

Intersections

References

External links 
Manitoba Official Map

250